4-HO-EPT (4-hydroxy-N-ethyl-N-propyltryptamine) is a rarely encountered chemical compound of the tryptamine class, which is structurally related to psilocin (4-HO-DMT).

Legality 
 United Kingdom: 4-HO-EPT is illegal in the United Kingdom as a result of the Psychoactive Substances Act of 2016.
 United States: 4-HO-EPT may be considered an analogue of psilocin, which is a Schedule I drug under the Controlled Substances Act. As such, the sale for human consumption would be illegal under the Federal Analogue Act.

See also 
 4-HO-DET
 4-HO-DPT
 4-HO-PiPT
 5-Fluoro-EPT
 5-MeO-EPT
 Ethylpropyltryptamine

References

External links 
 4-HO-EPT (Isomer Design)

Tryptamines
Designer drugs
Psychedelic tryptamines